NB II, currently known as the Merkantil Bank Liga for sponsorship reasons, is the second tier of Hungarian football. At the end of the 2004–05 season, the tournament format was changed from one division of 14 teams to two divisions: Keleti (Eastern) and Nyugati (Western), each with 16 teams. In 2013 the format was changed and there is one division again with 16 teams, and then 20 teams from 2015. The champion and the runner-up will ascend to the first division while the two lowest teams in NB II are relegated to NB III.

Format
On 2 March 2017, the Hungarian Football Federation announced that the number of the teams in the Nemzeti Bajnokság II will not be reduced to 12.

History
The second league was founded in 1901, having 8 teams. The first two teams would participate in a promotion playoff with the last 2 teams from the first league.
Even though the 4 rural districts were founded on paper in 1904, they only began to compete officially in the season 1907-1908. Thus the second league had 1 urban(Budapest) league and 4 rural leagues. The rural champions would participate in a tournament, the winner would face the urban league champion for the second league title. During the world war I the league was played with very few teams.

List of champions

External links
Official page (Hungarian)
NB II on www.soccerway.com

See also
Nemzeti Bajnokság I
Nemzeti Bajnokság III

References

 
2
Hun
Professional sports leagues in Hungary